In Albania the Berisha II Government was in office from 2009 to 2013. They were sworn in on 17 September 2009, replacing the Berisha I cabinet, which had been in office since 2005. They were followed by the Rama cabinet on September 15, 2013.

The coalition between the Democratic Party (PD), the Socialist Movement for Integration (LSI), the Republican Party (PR) and the Party for Justice, Integration and Unity (PDIU) formed the government cabinet. The government was shaken by claims of corruption. In September 2010, Minister of Economics Dritan Prifti and in January 2011, Prime Minister Ilir Meta, withdrew.

Shortly before the end of the reign, Sali Berisha had several LSI ministers in April 2013 through rights from her own party, since the LSI was involved in a coalition with the socialists in the election campaign

Cabinet

See also
 Council of Ministers (Albania)

References

External links

G64
2017 establishments in Albania
Ministries established in 2017
Cabinets established in 2017